Eighth Doctor comic stories are two ranges of comic series that featured the adventures of the eighth incarnation of The Doctor, the protagonist of the hit sc-fi series, Doctor Who.

Two separate series of original comic strips featuring the Eighth Doctor (and thus the likeness of actor Paul McGann) were published during the character's original tenure. The Radio Times published a weekly comic strip for a time. There was also the standard Doctor Who Magazine strip. The two series introduced brand-new companions, although the Eighth Doctor's only on-screen companion, Grace Holloway, also appeared twice. There were also cameo appearances by companions from past DWM series. The Master was also resurrected.

During the latter period of the DWM's comic stories the stories switched from black and white strips to full colour.

One of the strip's most noted fans was Russell T Davies, the future executive producer and head writer of the revived Doctor Who series. Davies had proposed that the Magazine's strip regenerate McGann's Doctor at the conclusion of The Flood. Whilst a draft was prepared to include the regeneration, the idea was abandoned as the Magazine team had reservations about taking such an important element from the television series should McGann ever be used in the series for flashback purposes. Eventually the decision was taken to simply end "The Flood" on a note similar to Survival, with The Eighth Doctor and Destrii's later adventures left a mystery to the readers.

It has been speculated that Davies loosely adapted elements from The Flood in his later DW storylines The Parting of the Ways and Army of Ghosts (in particular the Doctor absorbing the time/space vortex to save Rose Tyler's life, triggering his regeneration and the ghost-shifting infiltration of The Cybermen on an unsuspecting public)

Stories

Doctor Who Magazine

Radio Times

Doctor Who: The Eighth Doctor (Titan Comics)

See also
 List of Doctor Who comic stories
 First Doctor comic stories
 Second Doctor comic stories
 Third Doctor comic stories
 Fourth Doctor comic strips
 Fifth Doctor comic stories
 Sixth Doctor comic stories
 Seventh Doctor comic stories
 War Doctor comic stories
 Ninth Doctor comic stories
 Tenth Doctor comic stories
 Eleventh Doctor comic stories
 Twelfth Doctor comic stories
 Dalek comic strips, illustrated annuals and graphic novels

Comics based on Doctor Who
Eighth Doctor stories